The Slovakia women's national volleyball team represents Slovakia in international women's volleyball competitions and friendly matches. In May 2021, Slovakia qualified for the Women's European Volleyball Championship for the fifth time since 1993.

Competition record

European Championship
 Champions   Runners-up   Third place   Fourth place

European League
 Champions   Runners-up   Third place   Fourth place

Team

Current squad
The following is the Slovak roster in the 2019 European Championship.

Head coach: Marco Fenoglio

Former Squad
 2003 Women's European Volleyball Championship — 9th place
Petronela Biksadská, Lucia Bognarová, Danica Hanzelová, Lucia Hatinová, Simona Kleskenová, Renata Kolenaková, Petra Maleková, Adriana Marceková, Andrea Pavelková, Alica Székelyová, Gabriela Tomaseková, and Martina Viestová.
 2007 Women's European Volleyball Championship — 13th place
Petronela Biksadská, Ivana Bramborová, Jana Gogolová, Daniela Gonciová, Lucia Hatinová, Veronika Hrončeková, Simona Kleskeňová, Veronika Krajčová, Paula Kubová, Martina Noseková, Alica Székelyová, and Martina Viestová. Head Coach: Miroslav Cada.

See also
 Czechoslovakia women's national volleyball team
 Slovakia men's national volleyball team

References

National women's volleyball teams
Volleyball
Volleyball in Slovakia